Almaty International School (AIS) is a private school located in Almaty, Kazakhstan.

School hours & Study 
The school time is from 8:00-3:15. The students go out at 3:15, but some students and teachers stay until 5-6PM.

Students learn Literacy, Math, Cultural Studies, Science, World Languages, Music, Technology, Art, and PE (physical education).  Students that can not go yet into the appropriate age program go to IE (Intensive English) classes for Literacy and World Languages. They move up when they can go to the appropriate program of their age. The school has 6 Success Orientations to follow:

 Responsibility
 Kindness & Politeness
 Trustworthiness
 Aesthetic Appreciation
 Concern for Others
 Group Interaction

AP Courses 
The school offers 18 AP Courseswhich include:

 AP Art
 AP Calculus AB
 AP Statistics
 AP Biology 
 AP Chemistry 
 AP Environmental Science
 AP Physics 1
 AP Capstone/Research
 AP Music Theory
 AP Seminar
 AP Language/AP Literature
 AP Human Geography
 AP World History
 AP Micro/Macro Economics
 AP Spanish Language
 AP French Language
 AP Computer Science Principles
 Pre-AP English

See also
 List of international schools
List of schools in Almaty
 Kazakhstan International School, Almaty
 Quality Schools International

References

External links
 Official site
 Official AIS School Website

Schools in Kazakhstan
International schools in Kazakhstan
Education in Almaty
Quality Schools International
Educational institutions established in 1993
1993 establishments in Kazakhstan